Anita E. Friedt is an American diplomat.

Since 2014 she is the Principal Deputy Assistant Secretary in the U.S. State Department's Bureau of Arms Control, Verification, and Compliance (AVC).
Prior to joining the AVC Bureau, Friedt served as the Director for Arms Control and Nonproliferation at the National Security Council from 2009-2011 where she helped in the negotiation and ratification of the New START Treaty and worked to update conventional arms control in Europe, strengthen European security, and advance missile defense cooperation with Russia. Previous to her assignment on the National Security Council, Friedt served as the Director of the Office of Policy and Regional Affairs in the Bureau of European and Eurasian Affairs.

In her career at the Department of State, Friedt has been focusing on European foreign policy with an emphasis on Russia and European security and nonproliferation. Friedt worked on European security issues, including NATO missile defense and missile defense cooperation with Russia. Friedt began her career at the Department of State working as an advisor to Under Secretary of State for Political Affairs and then Deputy Secretary of State Walter Stoessel. She worked as a Soviet and then Russia foreign policy analyst in the State Department's Bureau of Intelligence and Research, and served two tours in the Political Section at the U.S. Embassy in Moscow, from 1989-1992 and again from 1997-1999.

Friedt has earned numerous awards, including seven Superior Honor Awards for her work on U.S.-Russia and European Security issues.

Friedt holds a B.A. from James Madison University, and an M.A. from Georgetown University. She is proficient in German and Russian.

References

External links

Official USG bio

Living people
United States National Security Council staffers
James Madison University alumni
Georgetown University alumni
American women diplomats
American diplomats
United States Assistant Secretaries of State
Year of birth missing (living people)
21st-century American women